is a 1969 Japanese jidaigeki film directed by Hideo Gosha. Set during the late Tokugawa period, the story follows a reclusive rōnin who is trying to atone for past transgressions.

Plot
Magobei Wakizaka is a samurai for the Sabai clan. A nearby island, Sado, boasts a rich gold mine which provides plentiful riches for the Tokugawa clan. When one of the gold ships sinks, the local fishermen recover some of the gold, intending to return it to the Tokugawa clan. However, Magobei's clan master, Rokugo Tatewaki, takes the gold and slaughters the fishermen so they cannot report the gold stolen. Magobei is appalled. He promises not to report Rokugo to the shogunate in exchange for Rokugo's promise to never do so again.

However, three years later, assassins sent by Rokugo's retainer, Kunai, come for Magobei, who is living in Edo. He realizes that Rokugo intends to steal more gold and slaughter more innocents. So Magobei returns to Sabai to face his former master. Rokugo hires another ronin, Samon Fujimaki, to kill Magobei, but Magobei eventually wins him over. Also, along the way, Magobei meets a young woman, Oriha, who survived the original slaughter. She and her brother, Rokuzo, join him on his way to Sabai.

At Sabai they learn that Rokugo intends to move a bonfire, which serves as a warning to passing ships against dangerous rocks, so that a gold ship will hit the rocks and sink. After recovering the gold, Rokugo intends to slaughter the peasants who help him in this endeavor. The combined efforts of Magobei, Samon, Oriha, and Rokuzo result in the correct bonfire being lit, the fake bonfire being put out, and the innocent peasants' lives being saved. Thus the gold-bearing ship evades the rocks. In a final showdown, amid falling snow, Magobei slays Rokugo, but is wounded by one of Rokugo's throwing knives.

Cast
 Tatsuya Nakadai as Magobei Wakizaka
 Kinnosuke Nakamura as Samon Fujimaki
 Tetsurō Tamba as Rokugo Tatewaki, Magobei's childhood friend, brother-in-law, and clan master
 Yoko Tsukasa as Shino, Rokugo's sister and Magobei's wife
 Ruriko Asaoka as Oriha
 Isao Natsuyagi as Kunai
 Ben Hiura as Rokuzo
 Kunie Tanaka as Hirosuke
 Susumu Kurobe as Omura Sobei
 Kō Nishimura as Ryu Ichigaku
 Hisashi Igawa as Takeuchi
 Eijirō Tōno as a Chief retainer

Production
Goyokin was the first Japanese production shot in Panavision. Initially, Toshiro Mifune was cast in Kinnosuke Nakamura's role, but was replaced several weeks into filming.

Release
Goyokin was released as a roadshow theatrical release in Japan on 1 May 1969 where it was distributed by Toho. The film received a general release in Japan on 17 May 1969.

The film was released in the United States by Toho International with English subtitles in September 1969. It was reissued in the United States with an English-language dub and a running time of 85 minutes under the title The Steel Edge of Revenge in September 1974.

Reception
Goyokin won the awards for Best Cinematography and Best Art Direction (Motoji Kojima) at the Mainichi Film Concours.

References

Footnotes

Sources

External links
 
 
 Review at Kung Fu Cinema
 Review at SaruDama
  Goyokin at the Japanese Movie Database

1969 films
1969 drama films
1960s adventure drama films
Films directed by Hideo Gosha
1960s Japanese-language films
Samurai films
Jidaigeki films
Japanese adventure drama films
Films produced by Sanezumi Fujimoto
Films scored by Masaru Sato
1960s Japanese films